The Film Critics Circle of Australia (FCCA) is an association of cinema critics and reviewers. It includes journalists in "media, television, major national and state papers, radio, national and state, online and freelance writers, Australian representatives from international magazines..and local specialist film magazines", and is based in Sydney.

The FCCA Annual Awards for Australian Film, rewarding makers of feature films and documentaries is highly regarded.

History 

The Sydney Film Critics' Circle became a national organisation as the Film Critics' Circle of Australia by October 1988. It joined International Federation of Film Critics (FIPRESCI), "which will allow its members to be considered for jury duty at international festivals, accreditation at festivals and markets."

The FCCA Awards have been presented each year since September 1988, with the inaugural winners including two awards each for The Year My Voice Broke: best director (John Duigan) and best male actor (Noah Taylor); and Shame: best screenplay (Beverly Blankenship and Michael Brindley) and best female actor (Deborra-Lee Furness).

2019

In 2019, the categories were Best Film, Best Director/Universal Pictures Award; Best Actor / Toil Films Award; Best Actress; Best Cinematography; Best Original Score / AGSC Award; Best Screenplay (Original Or Adapted) / Bunya Productions Award; Best Editor; Best Actor Supporting Role; Best Actress Supporting Role / MB Films Award;Best Feature Documentary / Kudos Knowledge Award.

Presidents

Presidents of the FCCA have included:
 1991–1993: Sandra Hall
 1994–1996: Peter Crayford
 1997–2000: John Hanrahan
 2001–2003: Julie Rigg
 2004–2006: Russell Edwards
 2007–2010: Paolo Remati
 2011–2014: Rod Quinn
 2015–2016: Russell Edwards
 2017–2020: Rose Capp
 2020–current: CJ Johnson

See also
Film Critics Circle of Australia Awards 2004
Film Critics Circle of Australia Awards 2005
Film Critics Circle of Australia Awards 2006
Film Critics Circle of Australia Awards 2011
List of film awards

References

Further reading

External links
  
 IMDB Listing 
 Award Archive Winners from 1998 to 2012. Archived from the original on 14 January 2014.

Australian film critics associations